Mahmudabad County is in Mazandaran province, Iran. The capital of the county is the city of Mahmudabad. At the 2006 census, the county's population was 90,054 in 24,135 households. The following census in 2011 counted 96,019 people in 28,957 households. At the 2016 census, the county's population was 98,407 in 32,810 households.

Administrative divisions

The population history of Mahmudabad County's administrative divisions over three consecutive censuses is shown in the following table. The latest census shows two districts, five rural districts, and two cities.

References

 

Counties of Mazandaran Province